The University of Campania Luigi Vanvitelli is an Italian research university founded in late 1991. Its main seat is in Caserta, but its academic departments are also located in a series of historic and contemporary buildings in Naples, Aversa, Capua and Santa Maria Capua Vetere.

It was previously named The Second University of Naples, as it was created to  reduce University of Naples Federico II's overload.

History and profile
The first Academic Year started on 1 November 1992.

Notably, the Primo Policlinico di Napoli was one of the oldest university hospitals in Naples. It also represents one of the university's core buildings, located in the city of Naples.

Organization

The University of Campania Luigi Vanvitelli is divided into academic departments, service and research centres.

Aversa 

Department of Engineering
Department of Architecture and Industrial Design

Caserta 
Department of Mathematics and Physics
Department of Psychology
Department of Political Science Jean Monnet
Department of Environmental, Biological and Pharmaceutical Sciences and Technologies

Capua 
Department of Economics

Naples 
School of Medical Sciences
Department of Precision Medicine
Department of General and Specialised Surgery for Women and Children
Department of Experimental Medicine
Multidisciplinary Department of Medicine for Surgery and Orthodontics
Department of Mental, Physical Health and Preventive Medicine
Department of Cardiothoracic and Respiratory Sciences
Medical, Surgical, Neurologic, Metabolic and Aging Sciences

Santa Maria Capua Vetere 
Department of Law
Department of Humanities and Cultural Heritage

 University of Campania Luigi Vanvitelli Website

Università degli Studi della Campania Luigi Vanvitelli
Educational institutions established in 1991
1991 establishments in Italy